Transmembrane channel-like protein 2 is a protein that in humans is encoded by the TMC2 gene.

Function 

This gene is considered a member of a gene family predicted to encode transmembrane proteins. The specific function of this gene is unknown; however, expression in the inner ear suggests that it may be crucial for normal auditory function.

Clinical significance 

Mutations in this gene may underlie hereditary disorders of balance and hearing.

References

Further reading